Holy Archangel Mikhail Church is an Eastern Orthodox church in Riga, the capital of Latvia. The church is situated at the address 170 Maskavas Street.

References 

Churches in Riga